Carlsbad Raceway was a motorsport facility located in Carlsbad, California.  Carlsbad Raceway featured a ¼ mile dragstrip and motocross track, which first opened in 1964.  Motorsports activities were shut down in August 2004.  The Carlsbad Raceway Business Park was erected on the land once occupied by the motorsports division.

History
The land was originally purchased by Larry Grismer and Sandy Belond in 1961 and in 1964 they opened Carlsbad Raceway.  The land was sold in 1986 to a third party and Carlsbad Raceway was leasing the property to use on a month to month basis until subsequently closing in August 2004 when the property owners decided to develop the land.

References

External links
 Carlsbad Raceway Official Website

Defunct drag racing venues
Motorsport venues in California
Defunct motorsport venues in the United States
Sports venues completed in 1964
1964 establishments in California
2004 disestablishments in California